Anopheles balabacensis is a species of mosquito in the Culicidae family. The scientific name of this species was first published in 1936 by Baisas.

References

balabacensis
Insects described in 1936